Maurício is the Portuguese variant of Mauricio (given name). The diminutive is Maurinho.

Sportspeople with the name include:
Maurício José da Silveira Júnior, Brazilian footballer in Greece
Maurício Copertino, Brazilian footballer
Maurício de Oliveira Anastácio, Brazilian footballer
Maurício dos Santos Nascimento, Brazilian footballer
Maurício Fernandes, Brazilian footballer
Maurício Ramos, Brazilian footballer
Maurinho, Brazilian footballer
Maurício Lima, Brazilian volleyball player

References

Portuguese masculine given names